Smoliska  is a village in the administrative district of Gmina Bełżec, within Tomaszów Lubelski County, Lublin Voivodeship, in eastern Poland.

References

Villages in Tomaszów Lubelski County